Jean-Pierre Muller (29 August 1924 – 1 July 2008) was a French fencer. He competed in the team épée event at the 1952 Summer Olympics.

References

External links
 

1924 births
2008 deaths
French male épée fencers
Olympic fencers of France
Fencers at the 1952 Summer Olympics
Sportspeople from Colmar
20th-century French people